Edge is a surname of Anglo-Saxon or Norse origin. Notable people with the surname include:

Government and politics
 Geoff Edge (born 1943), British politician
 Sir John Edge (1841–1926), Irish-born British justice in India
 Peter T. Edge, American government official
 Walter Evans Edge (1873–1956), American diplomat and politician
 Sir William Edge, 1st Baronet (1880–1948), British politician and businessman

Music
 Andrew Edge (born 1956), English musician
 Damon Edge (1949–1995; born Thomas Wisse), American musician
 Dexter Edge (born 1953), American musicologist
 Dustin Edge (born 1977), American singer-songwriter and musician
 Graeme Edge (1941–2021), English musician, songwriter and poet
 Norman Edge (1934–2018), American jazz musician
 Peter Edge, English-American record executive

Sports

Basketball
 Charles Edge (basketball) (born 1950), American basketball player
 Şafak Edge (born 1992), Turkish basketball player

Cricket
 Cyril Edge (1916–1985), English cricketer
 Geoffrey Edge (1911–1996), English cricketer

Football (soccer)
 Alf Edge (1864–1941), English footballer
 Bob Edge (1872–1918), English footballer
 Derek Edge (1942–1991), English footballer
 Jesse Edge (born 1995), New Zealand footballer
 Lewis Edge (born 1987), English footballer
 Roland Edge (born 1978), English footballer
 Shayne Edge (born 1971), American football player
 Thomas Edge (footballer) (born 1970), New Zealand footballer
 Tommy Edge (1898–1966), English footballer

Other
 Allan Edge, British slalom canoeist
 Bruce Edge (1924–1994), Australian rules footballer
 Butch Edge (born 1956), American baseball player
 Dave Edge (born 1954), British-Canadian Olympic long-distance runner
 Denny Edge (1903–1954), Canadian-born American player and coach of ice hockey
 Sandra Edge (born 1962), New Zealand netball coach and former player
 Selwyn Edge (1868–1940), British businessman, racing driver, and cyclist
 Steve Edge (rugby league) (born 1951), Australian rugby player

Writers
 Arabella Edge, English writer
 John T. Edge (born 1962), American writer and commentator
 Simon Edge (born 1964), British novelist and journalist

Other
 Charles Edge (architect) (1800–1867), British architect
 Charles Edge (computer scientist), American computer scientist and author
 Dawn Edge, British medical researcher
 Nina Edge (born 1962), English ceramicist, feminist and writer
 Rosalie Edge (1877–1962), American environmental advocate
 Steve Edge (born 1972), British actor and comedian
 Steve Edge (lawyer) (born 1950), British corporate tax lawyer
 Stuart Edge (born 1989 as Stuart Edgington), American actor and entertainer
 Thomas Edge (died 1624), English merchant, whaler and sealer
 William Edge (mathematician) (1904–1997), British mathematician

See also
 Morgan Edge, a DC Comics supervillain
 The Edge (born 1961 as David Howell Evans), guitarist for rock band U2

English-language surnames